Wáng Zhèn (王振) was the first Ming dynasty eunuch with power in the court. He served Zhu Qizhen.

Career 
The Zhihua Temple in Beijing was built in 1443 at his order.

He was killed in 1449 during the Tumu Crisis campaign against the Northern Yuan, during which the Ming emperor Zhu Qizhen was captured by Oirat Mongols.

References

External links 
 http://www.britannica.com/EBchecked/topic/635328/Wang-Zhen

Year of birth missing
1449 deaths
Ming dynasty eunuchs
Place of birth missing
Politicians from Zhangjiakou
People from Yu County, Hebei